Urdang, previously known as The Urdang Academy, is a performing arts academy based in Islington, London. Founded as a ballet school by Leonie Urdang in 1970 and had been under the direction of CEO Solange Urdang from 2001 until August 2022, the academy now provides specialist vocational training  in dance and musical theatre at Sixth Form, further and higher education level. It was acquired by City, University of London in April 2022. 

The academy is accredited by the Council for Dance Education and Training and offers Qualifications and Curriculum Authority-recognised qualifications validated by University of Birmingham, Anglia Ruskin University and Trinity College, London. It was rated "Outstanding" by Ofsted in 2011 and again in 2015 as well as being named one of the best places to study degree level musical theatre by The Stage in 2015. The academy was also shortlisted for School of the Year in The Stage 2017 Awards.

Locations

Urdang Academy was originally based in a church hall in Golders Green until 1978, when it moved to studios in Covent Garden. The old Finsbury Town Hall in Clerkenwell, Islington, has been the home of the Urdang Academy since January 2007, when the school relocated from its Covent Garden premises.

The newest development is the addition of the new contemporary building Urdang 2, which opened in September 2014. Located in Angel, Islington.

History
Urdang started life as a ballet school in 1970, founded by Leonie Urdang, who was born in Cape Town, South Africa, in 1939 and trained at the University of Cape Town with a particular focus on choreography. She immigrated to the UK in 1961.

Urdang rented space in two church halls to teach ballet students. She later relocated to an old warehouse school in Covent Garden, which was then converted into the Urdang Academy.

After Leonie Urdang's death in 2001, her daughter Solange has overseen the Academy. It is recognised as one of the UK's finest performing arts colleges, rated Outstanding by Ofsted and accredited by the Council for Dance Education and Training (UK). In 2015, The Stage named Urdang one of the best places to study degree level musical theatre.

It was acquired in April 2022 by City, University of London who announced that " This acquisition is part of an ambitious new strategy to enhance and develop City’s reputation for music and its engagement with practice and the creative industries".

Courses

Full-time courses
The Urdang offers a degree  course in dance and musical theatre, which both lead to Qualifications and Curriculum Authority-recognised qualifications. The degree is validated by the City University of London 
BA (Hons) in Professional Dance and Musical Theatre
Track A: An equal emphasis in all Musical Theatre Genres
Track C: A greater emphasis on acting and singing
Track B: A greater emphasis on dance to produce versatility

Accreditation
Urdang Academy is an Accredited School of the Council for Dance, Drama and Musical Theatre (CDMT) and is an Approved Dance Centre by the Imperial Society of Teachers of Dancing (ISTD). It’s  Degree course by the City University of London

Admissions
Entry to the academy is by audition only. Applicants are expected to attend an audition where they will be assessed in a jazz class, an acting workshop, a ballet class, a solo song presentation, a physical assessment and an interview.

Performances
In their third year, students perform in three full scale shows: a dance production, a musical presentation and a graduate revue showcase. First and second year students also take part in an end-of-year show and some smaller in-house productions during their training. Urdang have previously used the Bloomsbury Theatre, the Shaw Theatre, the Hackney Empire and the Pleasance Theatre for performances.

Link Talent
Third year students of the academy are represented by the in-house agency, Link Talent, which helps students gain placements on shows such as Strictly Come Dancing and The X Factor and auditions for West End shows. Students can be represented by Link Talent for up to six months after graduation allowing students the best opportunity in transition from student to professional.

Patrons
Pippa Ailion MBE
Sean Cheesman
Arlene Phillips CBE
Wayne Sleep OBE
Anthony Van Laast MBE
Brian Friedman
 Matt Henry MBE
JaQuel Knight

Notable alumni
Graduates from Urdang regularly perform in musicals in the West End and on UK tours as well as dancing on shows such as The X Factor and Strictly Come Dancing. Some have also choreographed and danced for pop artists including Beyoncé, Janet Jackson, Kylie Minogue, Lady Gaga, Little Mix and Take That. Other graduates go on to work as part of cruise ship entertainment. Hollyoaks actress Holly Weston also attended the Academy.

References

External links
 Official website for the Urdang Academy

1970 establishments in England
Dance schools in the United Kingdom
Drama schools in London
Educational institutions established in 1970
Schools of the performing arts in the United Kingdom